Qualification for the 2022 Little League World Series took place in ten United States regions and ten international regions from February through August 2022. International regions will gain entry to the tournament after the 2021 tournament consisted of only teams from the United States as a result of the COVID-19 pandemic.

This is the first year that 20 teams will qualify for the Little League World Series. In the United States, two new regions were created (Metro and Mountain) made up of states being pulled from already existing regions. On the international side, a rotational schedule consisting of Cuba, Panama, and Puerto Rico will begin. Two teams from the three countries will automatically qualify for the LLWS, while the third may still qualify through its normal regional tournament. In 2022, the two teams qualifying automatically are Panama and Puerto Rico. Cuba will compete in the Caribbean Region tournament in 2022 but will directly qualify in 2023 and 2024.

United States

Great Lakes 
The tournament took place in Whitestown, Indiana from August 6–11.

Metro 
The tournament took place in Bristol, Connecticut from August 6–12.

Mid-Atlantic 
The tournament took place in Bristol, Connecticut from August 7–12.

Midwest 
The tournament took place in Whitestown, Indiana from August 5–12.

Mountain 
The tournament took place in San Bernardino, California from August 7–12.

New England 
The tournament took place in Bristol, Connecticut from August 6–11.

Northwest 
The tournament took place in San Bernardino, California from August 6–11.

Southeast 
The tournament took place in Warner Robins, Georgia from August 4–9.

Southwest 
The tournament took place in Waco, Texas from August 4–9.

West 
The tournament took place in San Bernardino, California from August 6–12.

International

Asia-Pacific 
The tournament took place in Hwaseong, South Korea from June 29–July 4.

Teams

Bracket

Australia 
The tournament took place in Macquarie Fields, New South Wales from June 8–13.

Pool A

Pool B

Bracket

Canada 
The tournament took place in Calgary, Alberta from August 4–12.

Bracket

Caribbean 
The tournament took place in Punta Cana, Dominican Republic from July 6–9.

Pool A

Pool B

Bracket

Europe and Africa 
The tournament took place in Moergestel, Netherlands from July 16–22.

Bracket

Japan 
The tournament took place in Hachiōji, Tokyo from July 23–24. Prior to the start of the tournament, Musashi Fuchi LL and Ryūgasaki LL decided to withdraw due to positive COVID tests among their players and/or coaching staff. Therefore, their first round opponents were given an automatic bye to the quarterfinal round.

Latin America 
The tournament took place in Managua, Nicaragua from July 2–9.

Mexico 
The tournament took place in Matamoros, Tamaulipas from July 10–14.

Panama 
In February 2022, Aguadulce Cabezera Little League won the Panama Region championship after defeating Villa de Los Santos Little League by a 12–0 final score. Overall, the team finished with a 5–0 record and outscored their opponents 30–3.

Puerto Rico 
The double elimination tournament began May 28 and ended on July 2.

Results

Bracket

References

2022 Little League World Series
2022 in baseball